Donald Hill (born 6 January 1940) is a New Zealand former cricketer. He played first-class cricket for Auckland and Canterbury between 1961 and 1968.

See also
 List of Auckland representative cricketers

References

External links
 

1940 births
Living people
New Zealand cricketers
Auckland cricketers
Canterbury cricketers
Cricketers from Christchurch